Penstemon pseudospectabilis (desert beardtongue, or desert penstemon) a species of penstemon. It's native to the southwestern United States, where it grows in desert and plateau habitat types, such as sandy washes, scrub, and woodland. The plant is generally a shrub growing to one meter, with many erect stems. The thin leaves are oval with wide, pointed tips and serrated edges. They are arranged oppositely in pairs, many are completely fused at the bases about the stem, forming a disc. The inflorescence bears tubular flowers with expanded, lobed mouths and glandular hairs on most surfaces, except the hairless staminode. The flower grows to 2.5 centimeters and is reddish pink.

External links 
Jepson Manual Treatment
Photo gallery

pseudospectabilis
Flora of the Southwestern United States